

The Bharat Swati (or sometimes BHEL Swati) is an Indian two-seat training monoplane designed by the Technical Centre of Directorate General of Civil Aviation and built by Bharat Heavy Electricals Limited.

Design and development
The Swati is a low-wing cantilever monoplane with a steel tube fuselage covered in fabric at the rear and composite material at the front. It has metal tail surfaces and wooden wings and a fixed landing gear with a steerable nosewheel. The Swati has a  Lycoming O-235 piston engine at the front driving a two-bladed propeller. Directorate General of Civil Aviation ordered 40 to be distributed to civil flying clubs in India.

Variants
LT-1M Swati
LT-2M Swati

Specifications

Incidents and Accidents
On 3 June 1993 a Swati aircraft registration number VT-STC being test flown at Haridwar crashed when its starboard wing broke off after coming out of a loop killing the test pilot.

On 29 November 2001 a Swati LT II aircraft registration number VT-STO of the Kerala Aviation Training Centre on a training flight at Thiruvananthapuram crashed due to pilot error destroying the aircraft.

References

Notes

Bibliography

1990s Indian civil trainer aircraft
Low-wing aircraft
Single-engined tractor aircraft
Swati